Erica Rose may refer to:

Erica Rose (actor) (born 1983), American lawyer and reality TV personality
Erica Rose (swimmer) (born 1982), American competition swimmer